Wybrzeże Gdańsk (Gdańsk Coast Club) is a Polish multi-sports club established in 1945, most known for the motorcycle speedway team who race in the 1. Liga.

Speedway

History

1948 to 1999 
The club competed in the inaugural 1948 Polish speedway season, under the name of GKM Gdańsk.  The following year the name changed to Związkowiec Gdańsk  and competed until 1950. Speedway returned to Gdańsk in 1957 under the name of LPŻ Gdańsk (1957-1959) and Legia Gdańsk from 1960.

Legia won a silver medal in the Team Speedway Polish Championship in 1960 and their star rider Marian Kaiser also became the Polish champion after winning the Polish Individual Speedway Championship in 1960. Kaiser went on to win the Golden Helmet in 1962, when the club referred to itself as Wybrzeże Gdańsk.

The 1960s remained a positive era for the club and they won the bronze medal in 1965 and the silver medal in 1967 headed by riders such as Kaiser, Zbigniew Podlecki and Henryk Żyto.

The 1970s saw little team success but Zenon Plech was the Golden Helmet winner in 1978 and Polish champion in 1979.

The 1980s proved to be another quiet period, with the only significant honours being a team silver medal in 1985 and the Polish Pairs Speedway Championship (Zenon Plech and Grzegorz Dzikowski) in the same season. However, Zenon Plech won two more Polish titles in 1984 and 1985. The 1990s continued in the same manner with little success except winning the second division in 1993 and winning a bronze medal in 1999 after signing Tony Rickardsson and Sebastian Ułamek.

2000 to present 
Gdansk were inaugural members of the Ekstraliga in 2000, but they suffered relegation to the 1. Liga that season, this was despite a bronze medal win the previous season. They bounced back by winning 1.Liga in 2001.

In recent years their success has been restricted to the 1. Liga title in 2013 and the 2. Liga title in 2015.

Teams

2023 team
  Nicolai Klindt
  Michael Jepsen Jensen
  Mads Hansen
  Keynan Rew
  Daniel Kaczmarek
  Milosz Wysocki
  Mateusz Lopuski
  Jacob Kowalski

Previous teams

2022 squad

  Rasmus Jensen
  Wiktor Trofimov
  Piotr Gryszpinski
  Jakub Jamróg
  Timo Lahti
  Kamil Marciniec 
  Karol Zupinski
  Milosz Wysocki
  Adrian Gala

Notable riders

Honours

Other Sections 
The club had many other sections over the years, out of which only the speedway team survived throughout the club's history. The men's handball team has been revived in 2010.

Athletics
The athletics team competed between 1945-1971. The club's achievements were:
 22 Senior Polish Championship Titles
 European Championships Vice-Champion: Władysław Nikiciuk - javelin, 1966 European Athletics Championships
 European Championships Bronze Medal: Władysław Komar - shot put, 1966 European Athletics Championships

Basketball
There was a men's section which existed between 1949-1995. The club made a brief re-appearance 2007-2009 before it folded once more. The club's honours include:

 4x Polish Champions: 1971, 1972, 1973, 1978
 3x Polish Cup Winners: 1976, 1978, 1979
 3 Individual European Championship medals 
 Zbigniew Dregier 
Silver: Wrocław 1963
Bronze: Moscow 1965, Helsinki 1967

Boxing
The section existed between 1945-1990. Their honours included:
 21 Individual Polish Senior Championship titles
3 Olympic Medals 
Silver: Aleksy Antkiewicz, Helsinki 1952
Bronze: Aleksy Antkiewicz, London 1948 
Bronze: Hubert Skrzypczak, Mexico City 1968
 European Championships
 3 titles (Gold Medals)
Zenon Stefaniuk, 1953 & 1955
Hubert Skrzypczak, 1968
 3 Runners-up titles (Silver Medals) 
Bogdan Węgrzyniak, 1953
Henryk Dampc, 1959
Hubert Skrzypczak, 1965
 1 Bronze Medal
Aleksy Antkiewicz (1953)

Gymnastics
The section only existed for 4 years between 1952-1956. Lidia Szczerbińska won a bronze medal at the 1956 Summer Olympics in Melbourne whilst representing the club.

Judo
The section existed between 1958-2002. Club honours of the section are:

 45 Individual Polish Championship Titles
 11 Team Polish Championship titles
 2 Olympic Medals 
Silver: Janusz Pawłowski, Seoul 1988 
Bronze: Janusz Pawłowski, Moscow 1980
 4 World Judo Championship Bronze Medals 
Antoni Reiter: 1973 
Janusz Pawłowski: 1979, 1983, 1987
 10 European Championship Medals
1 Gold Medal
Antoni Reiter: 1975 
1 Silver Medal
Antoni Reiter: 1974
8 Bronze Medals
Antoni Reiter: 1976 
Jan Okrój: 1963 
Kazimierz Jaremczak: 1965
Czesław Kur: 1968, 1969
Janusz Pawłowski: 1982, 1983, 1986

Other sections
There were five other sections of the club, but they were short-lived and without any major sporting success.
 Football (1945-1961)
 Volleyball (1945-1969)
 Cycling (1945-1955)
 Motorcycle club (1948-1955)
 Wrestling (1951-1955)

References 

Polish speedway teams
Sport in Gdańsk
Sports clubs established in 1945
1945 establishments in Poland